Elections to Weymouth and Portland Borough Council were held on 4 May 2006. One third of the council was up for election and the council stayed under no overall control.

After the election, the composition of the council was
Liberal Democrat 13
Conservative 11
Labour 7
Independent 5

Election result

One Labour candidate was unopposed.

Ward results

References
2006 Weymouth and Portland election result
Ward results 

2006
2006 English local elections
2000s in Dorset